Representative continental flood basalts (also known as traps) and oceanic plateaus, together forming a listing of large igneous provinces:

See also
List of Oceanic Landforms
World's largest eruptions

Footnotes

References 

Flood basalts
Large igneous provinces
Geomorphology
Geology-related lists
Historical geology
Earth sciences
Oceanic plateaus